Iraj (Pahlavi: ērič; from Avestan: 𐬀𐬌𐬭𐬌𐬌𐬀 airiia, literally "Aryan") is the seventh Shah of the Pishdadian dynasty, depicted in the Shahnameh. Based on Iranian mythology, he is the youngest son of Fereydun. In the Avestan legends, Pahlavi literature, Sasanian-based Persian sources, some Arabic sources, and particularly in Shahnameh, he is considered the name-giver of the Iranian nation, the ancestor of their royal houses, and a paragon of those slain in defense of just causes.

Family Tree

Sources

External links
Shahnameh in Persian Wikisource: Freydun chapter (in Persian)
The story of Freydun and his three sons in English Wikisourse

Mythological kings
Pishdadian dynasty